Ulf Håkan Hardenberger (born 27 October 1961 in Malmö) is a Swedish trumpeter.  Taking up the trumpet at the age of eight under the guidance of hometown teacher Bo Nilsson, Hardenberger pursued further studies at the Paris Conservatoire, with Pierre Thibaud, and in Los Angeles with Thomas Stevens.  He has quickly established a career as a virtuoso who possesses not only an impressive command of the classical repertoire, but has also commissioned many new works from contemporary composers, including Harrison Birtwistle, Toru Takemitsu, Hans Werner Henze, Rolf Martinsson, Mark-Anthony Turnage, Heinz Karl Gruber, Benjamin Staern, Brett Dean, Tobias Broström and Arvo Pärt.  Hardenberger has been called "the cleanest, subtlest trumpeter on earth" by The Times.

Discography

Albums
 2019: Stories - Trumpet Concertos
2018: The Scene Of The Crime
2017: Hakan Hardenberger Plays Dean & Francesconi
2013: Turnage: Speranza, From the Wreckage by Hakan Hardenberger 
2012: Both Sides, Now
 2011: Haydn/Hummel/Richter: Virtuoso Trumpet Concertos
 2007: The Art of the Trumpet
 2006: 20/21 Gruber 'Aerial', Eötvös 'Jet Stream', Turnage 'From the Wreckage', Gothenburg Symphony Orchester, Peter Eötvös (Grammophone 2894776150)
 2006: Exposed Throat Gruber, Börtz, Ruders, Henderson, Holloway (BIS 1281)
 2002: British Music Collection: Orchestral Works Peter Maxwell Davies, BBC Philharmonic Orchestra, Elgar Howarth (Decca 4734302)
 2002: Adventures - Mysteries of the Macabre Gyorgy Ligeti, Roland Pöntinen (Deutsche Grammophon 4716082)
 2002: Concertos Martinsson, Pärt, Tanberg, Gothenburg Symphony Orchestra, Neeme Järvi (BIS 1208)
 2001: British Music Collection: Dispelling the Fears Mark-Anthony Turnage, Philharmonia, Wallace, Harding (Decca 4688142)
 2001: Prières san Parole Constant, Tomasi, Jolivet, Sauguet, Jansen, Satie, Damase, Hakim, Simon Preston (BIS 1109)
 2001: British Music Collection: Endless Parade Harrison Birtwistle, BBC Philharmonic, Elgar Howarth (Decca 4734302)
 2000: Wind Concertos Joseph Haydn, Academy of St Martin-in-the-Fields, Sir Neville Marriner, Elgar Howarth (Decca Eloquence 4681802)
 2000: Panorama - Virtuoso Trumpet Clarke, Albinoni, M. Haydn, JS Bach, Stamitz, Hummel, I Musici, Sir Neville Marriner, Hans Stadlmair, Simon Preston (DG 4692292)
 2000: Famous Classical Trumpet Concertos (2 CDs) Haydn, Hertel, Hummel, Stamitz…, The Academy of St.Martin-in-the-Fields, The London Philharmonic, Sir Neville Marriner, Elgar Howarth, Simon Preston, I Musici (Philips 464028-2)
 2000: Håkan Hardenberger plays Swedish Trumpet Concertos Börtz, Sandström, Rabe, Malmö Symphony Orchestra, Gilbert Varga (BIS 1021)
 1999: Concertos for Piano and Trumpet Shostakovitch, Enesco, City of Birmingham Symphony Orchestra, Paavo Järvi, Leif Ove Andsnes (EMI 5567602)
 1999: Fireworks - Music composed by Elgar Howarth: Vol 3 Elgar Howarth, Eikanger-Bjørsvik Musikklag, Elgar Howarth (Doyen Records)
 1997: Brass Concertos Holmboe, Aalborg Symphony Orchestra, Arwel Hughes, Christian Lindberg, Jens Bjørn-Larsen (BIS 802)
 1996: Emotion Henze, Takemitsu, Berio, Kagel, Tisné, Blake Watkins, Henze, Ligeti (Philips 446 065-2)
 1995: Cycle-Concert Skalkottas, H.Holliger / B.Canino / K. Thunemann (Philips 442 795-2/Universal Music 470-486-2)
 1994: Baroque Trumpet Concerti Albinoni, Vivaldi, Corelli, Torelli, Marcello, Viviani, Franceschini, Baldassare, I Musici di Roma (Philips 442 131-2)
 1994: The Virtuoso Trumpet J-B Arban, Jean Françaix, Antoine Tisné, Arthur Honegger, Sir Peter Maxwell Davies, Folke Rabe, John Hartmann, Roland Pöntinen (BIS 287)
 1994: Requiem Henze, Ensemble Modern, Ingo Metzmacher, Ueli Wiget (Sony SK 58972)
 1992: Trumpet and Organ Spectacular Martini, Clarke, Albinoni, Bach, Læillet, Gounod, Telemann, Simon Preston (Philips 434-074-2)
 1990: Trumpet Concertos Telemann, Academy of St Martin-in-the-Fields, Iona Brown, Michael Laird, William Houghton (Philips 420954)
 1990: Concertos Hummel, Hertel, Stamitz, Haydn,J., Academy of St Marin-in-the-Fields, Sir Neville Marriner (Philips 420-203-2)
 1989: Kantaten Bach, JS, Carl Philipp Emanuel Bach Chamber Orchestra, Barbara Hendrichs, Peter Schreier (EMI 7498452)
 1989: At the Beach Höhne, Dinicu, Thomson, Mendelssohn, Waldtenfel, Bernstein, Glazunov, Ibert, Weide, Reger, Bitsch, Pöutine, Roland Pöntinen (Philips 422-344-2/Polygram Classics)
 1988: Requiem for Fallen Soldiers Tubin, Lund Studentsångare, Gothenburg Symphony Orchestra, Neeme Järvi (BIS - CD297)
 1986: Trumpet Concertos  Haydn, Hummel, Hertel, Stamitz, First Recording,  Academy of St. Martin-in-the-Fields, Sir Neville Marriner (Philips 420 203-2)

References

External links
 Official website

1961 births
Living people
Swedish trumpeters
Male trumpeters
Honorary Members of the Royal Academy of Music
Litteris et Artibus recipients
Musicians from Malmö
21st-century trumpeters
21st-century Swedish male musicians